On 25 September 2008 Pakistani troops fired on two American OH-58 Kiowa reconnaissance helicopters. U.S. ground troops, who the helicopters were supporting, returned fire. No one was injured on either side and the helicopters were undamaged. American and NATO officials asserted that the helicopters were flying within Afghan territory to protect an armed patrol. Pakistani officials declared that the helicopters were inside Pakistani territory and were fired upon by "flares" as a warning.

References

Attacks in Pakistan in 2015